Fața may refer to several places in Romania:

 Fața, a village in Albac Commune, Alba County
 Fața-Lăzești, a village in Scărișoara Commune, Alba County
 Fața Abrudului, a village in Câmpeni town, Alba County
 Fața Cristesei and Fața Lăpușului, villages in Arieșeni Commune, Alba County
 Fața Pietrii, a village in Stremț Commune, Alba County
 Fața lui Nan, a village in Cozieni Commune, Buzău County
 Fața Roșie, a village in Bătrâna Commune, Hunedoara County
 Fața Motrului, a village in Stângăceaua Commune, Mehedinți County
 Fața Cremenii, a village in Tâmna Commune, Mehedinți County
 Fața (river), a tributary of the Timișana in Timiș County

See also 
 Fețeni (disambiguation)